USDT may refer to:

 United States Department of the Treasury
 USDT, the ticker symbol for the Tether stablecoin cryptocurrency
 Tazovsky Airport (ICAO airport code: USDT) located at Tazovsky, Tazovsky District, Yamalo-Nenets Autonomous Okrug, Russia
 University of Science and Defense Technologies, an Iranian research institute of the Malek-Ashtar University of Technology
 ultra-slim desktop, a computer formfactor used by Hewlett-Packard, see HP business desktops

See also
 DT (disambiguation)